Lawrence Marshall Johnston (born June 6, 1941) is a Canadian former professional ice hockey player, coach and executive. He played as a right winger for the Minnesota North Stars and California Golden Seals of the National Hockey League (NHL). He has also coached in the NHL for the California Golden Seals, Colorado Rockies, and served as general manager of the Ottawa Senators.

Career
Johnston was an All-American player at the University of Denver prior to his NHL career, and later coached the Pioneers from 1977 to 1981. He also represented Canada at the 1964 and 1968 Olympic Games, serving as team captain in 1968.

Canada, Czechoslovakia and Sweden finished with identical records of five wins and two losses at the 1964 Winter Olympics. Canada thought they had won the bronze medal based on the goal differential in the three games among the tied countries. When they attended the presentation of the Olympic medals, they were disappointed to learn they had finished in fourth place based on goal differential of all seven games played. The players and Canadian Amateur Hockey Association executives accused that International Ice Hockey Federation president Bunny Ahearne, made a last-minute decision to change the rules and take away a medal from Canada. Later that night, the players gathered in Father David Bauer's room where Johnston summarized the team's feeling that, "The shepherd and his flock have been fleeced".

Johnston broke into the NHL as a player during the expansion season of 1967–68. He would play parts of four seasons with the North Stars before moving to the California Golden Seals in 1971–72.

Upon retiring as a player, Johnston served as head coach the Golden Seals from 1973 to 1975 before moving to the NCAA, where he spent six seasons on the coaching staff of the University of Denver, including head coach from 1977 to 1981.

Johnston returned to the NHL in 1981, joining the Colorado Rockies as assistant general manager and assistant coach, soon being promoted to head coach. When the franchise relocated to New Jersey to become the Devils, Johnston remained with the club and was later named Director of Player Personnel, a position he held for ten years.

Johnston then joined the Ottawa Senators organization in 1996 as Director of Player Personnel. In 1999 he was named the club's general manager, replacing the departing Rick Dudley. After three successful seasons at the helm of the Senators, Johnston announced his retirement so he could spend more time with his wife and family.

Johnston is a member of the International Ice Hockey Federation's Hall of Fame.

Career statistics

Regular season and playoffs

International

Head coaching record

NHL

College

Awards and achievements
 2006 Stanley Cup champion  (Carolina)
 IIHF Hall of Fame member
 1971: Eddie Shore Award

References

External links
 

1941 births
Living people
California Golden Seals coaches
California Golden Seals players
Carolina Hurricanes scouts
Canada men's national ice hockey team coaches
Canadian ice hockey coaches
Canadian ice hockey right wingers
Canadian people of Norwegian descent
Chicago Blackhawks executives
Chicago Blackhawks scouts
Cleveland Barons (1937–1973) players
Colorado Rockies (NHL) coaches
Denver Pioneers men's ice hockey coaches
Denver Pioneers men's ice hockey players
Ice hockey people from Saskatchewan
Ice hockey players at the 1964 Winter Olympics
Ice hockey players at the 1968 Winter Olympics
IIHF Hall of Fame inductees
Medalists at the 1968 Winter Olympics
Minnesota North Stars players
National Hockey League general managers
NCAA men's ice hockey national champions
New Jersey Devils coaches
New Jersey Devils executives
Olympic bronze medalists for Canada
Olympic ice hockey players of Canada
Olympic medalists in ice hockey
Ottawa Senators executives
Ottawa Senators general managers
People from Birch Hills
Stanley Cup champions